Edward Corrigan may refer to:
Ed Corrigan (Francis Edward Corrigan, born 1946), British mathematician and theoretical physicist
Edward C. Corrigan (1843–1924), American horse racing executive 
E. Gerald Corrigan (born 1941), American banker